The Democratic Alliance of Nagaland is a state level coalition of political parties in Nagaland. It headed the Nagaland government with the Bharatiya Janata Party (BJP). It is formed in 2003 after Nagaland Legislative Assembly election with Naga People's Front (NPF) and BJP. The alliance is in power in Nagaland since 2003.

Present Members and Seats in Nagaland Assembly

Chief Ministers

Indian general election, 2014

Chief Minister of Nagaland that time, Neiphiu Rio has been chosen as the candidate of Democratic Alliance of Nagaland's for the lone Lok Sabha constituency of the state. Rio defeated closest Indian National Congress rival K.V. Pusa by 4,00,225 votes, which is the second highest winning margin after Narendra Modi in the country.

References

External links 
Official Website of Naga Peoples Front

Coalition governments of India
Political party alliances in India